Bolto is a locality in the Murraylands region of South Australia. It consists of a row of shacks and a campsite on the eastern side of the Murray River opposite Mannum. It is faced by Mannum on the other side of the river and is completely surrounded by Cowirra on the east side.

References

Towns in South Australia